Loïs Diony (born 20 December 1992) is a French professional footballer who plays as a striker for  club Angers.

Club career

Early career 
Diony made his professional debut in November 2012 for FC Nantes, in a 0–0 draw against Niort.

After spending six months in the fourth division with his hometown club Stade Montois, he joined Dijon FCO in January 2014.

Dijon
With Diony securing a move to Ligue 2 side Dijon, he proved to be a vital asset as he was their top scorer as they achieved promotion into Ligue 1. The following season, Diony was again Dijon's top scorer - with 11 goals - helping them maintain their Ligue 1 position.

Saint-Étienne
In 2017 Diony made a move to AS Saint-Étienne, but he made a slow start with Les Verts, recording no goals and just one assist in his first 16 games for the club, causing him to be loaned out at the start of 2018.

Bristol City (loan)
On 25 January 2018, Loïs Diony joined Bristol City on loan for the remainder of the 2017–18 with the option to make it permanent for a reported £10m. Despite looking a promising addition, Diony's stint in England was unsuccessful, and he played just seven times, contributing to 0 goals in the process.

Angers
On 10 September 2020, Diony signed with Ligue 1 side Angers SCO. He joined on a free transfer, but the deal included a sell-on percentage fee clause. Diony agreed on a three-year contract with Angers.

Red Star Belgrade (loan)
On 5 July 2021, he went to Red Star Belgrade on loan.

Personal life
Diony is of Martiniquais 
and Malagasy descent.

Career statistics

Honours
Saint-Étienne
 Coupe de France runner-up: 2019–20

Red Star Belgrade
 Serbian SuperLiga: 2021–22
 Serbian Cup: 2021–22

References

External links

Loïs Diony foot-national.com Profile

1992 births
Living people
People from Mont-de-Marsan
Sportspeople from Landes (department)
Association football forwards
French footballers
French people of Martiniquais descent
Ligue 1 players
Ligue 2 players
FC Nantes players
Stade Montois (football) players
Dijon FCO players
AS Saint-Étienne players
Bristol City F.C. players
Angers SCO players
French expatriate footballers
Expatriate footballers in England
English Football League players
Red Star Belgrade footballers
Serbian SuperLiga players
Expatriate footballers in Serbia
Footballers from Nouvelle-Aquitaine